Yeo Han-koo (born 14 November 1969) is the former Minister for Trade of South Korea served under President Moon Jae-in from 2021 to 2022. Yeo is considered a veteran trade negotiator and technocrat.

In the first cross-departmental committee on trade Yeo chaired, he proposed five trade topics that its policies should prioritise from supply chain, technology and digital transformation to vaccine and carbon neutrality. Yeo is expected to lead the country's accession to CPTPP and DEPA.

Over the past 25 years, he worked in various government agencies since he passed the Korean state civil servant exam in 1992. Before promoted to President Moon's third trade minister, Yeo served as his secretary for New Southern and New Northern Policies at Office of the President. Yeo also served as the deputy trade minister after his predecessor Yoo Myung-hee was promoted to the country's first woman trade minister.

Along with various trade related roles in the government, he worked at World Bank Group's International Finance Corporation as its senior investment officer from 2010 to 2014.

Yeo holds a bachelor's degree in business administration from Seoul National University as well as a Master of Public Administration and a MBA from Harvard University.

References 

1969 births
Living people

People from Seoul

Seoul National University alumni
Harvard Business School alumni
Harvard Kennedy School alumni
Government ministers of South Korea
Trade ministers of South Korea